is a capital city located in Kagawa Prefecture, Japan. , the city had an estimated population of 414,134 in 190120 households and a population density of 1100 persons per km². It is the capital city of the prefecture.

Geography
Takamatsu is located in central Kagawa Prefecture on the island of Shikoku. The city is located in the Takamatsu Plain, which is part of the Sanuki Plain, and is occupied by a gentle slope as a whole. The northern part faces the Seto Inland Sea, forming a semicircular urban area centered on Takamatsu Port and Takamatsu New Port (commonly known as Shinminato).The western part of the city consists of an alluvial fan formed by the sedimentation of the Koto River. The eastern part is a flooded plain formed by the Kasuga River and Shinkawa River. In the northeastern part of the island, there is Yashima, a table-shaped plateau protruding into the Seto Inland Sea, which was the site of the Battle of Yashima in the Genpei War, and Cape Takei, the northernmost tip of the main island of Shikoku. Parts of the city are located within the borders of the Setonaikai National Park. The city area also includes a number of small inhabited islands in the Seto Inland Sea.

Neighbouring municipalities 
Kagawa Prefecture
Sakaide
Sanuki
Miki
Ayagawa
 Honnō
Tokushima Prefecture
 Mima

Climate
Takamatsu has a humid subtropical climate (Köppen climate classification Cfa) with hot, humid summers, and cool winters. Some rain falls throughout the year, but the months from May to September have the heaviest rain.

Demographics
Per Japanese census data, the population of Takamatsu in 2020 is 417,496 people. Takamatsu has been conducting censuses since 1920.

History 
The area of Takamatsu was part of ancient Sanuki Province. During the Heian and Kamakura period, as the closest port to Honshu from Shikoku island, the area was a transportation center and gateway for pilgrims to the Kotohira Shrine. During the Sengoku period, Ikoma Chikamasa suit the first Takamatsu Castle in 1588. In 1642, Matsudaira Yorishige, the son of Tokugawa Yorifusa of Mito Domain and grandson of Tokugawa Ieyasu, was awarded the 120,000 koku Takamatsu Domain, which his descendants would continue to rule until the Meiji restoration.

Following the Meiji restoration, the city of Takamatsu was created with the establishment of the modern municipalities system on February 15, 1890. The castle tower formerly used as the symbol of the city was destroyed during the Meiji period.  The city borders expanded in several iterations by the annexation on neighboring villages and towns. During World War II, Takamatsu was selected as a target by the United States' XXI Bomber Command because the city was an important focal point of Shikoku's rail and road transit systems, and containing some industry vital to supporting the war effort. On July 3, 1945, at 6:40 PM (JST) 128 B-29 Superfortress bombers dropped over 800 tons of incendiary bombs on Takamatsu, destroying 78% of the built-up areas of the city and killing 1359 people.

The city quickly recovered after the war, and its borders continued to expand. On April 1, 1999 it was designated a core city with increased local autonomy.

On September 26, 2005, the town of Shionoe (from Kagawa District) was merged into Takamatsu. On January 10, 2006, Takamatsu absorbed the following towns: Aji and Mure (from Kita District), Kagawa and Kōnan (from Kagawa District), and Kokubunji (from Ayauta District).

Government
Takamatsu has a mayor-council form of government with a directly elected mayor and a unicameral city council of 40 members. Takamatsu contributes 15 members to the Kagawa Prefectural Assembly. In terms of national politics, the city is divided between Kagawa 1st district and Kagawa 2nd district  of the lower house of the Diet of Japan.

Crime and safety
The Shinwa-kai yakuza syndicate is based in Takamatsu. The Shinwa-kai is the only designated yakuza group based in the Shikoku region.

In October 2017, Japan Today reported 5 people received minor injuries when a wild boar entered a local Aeon mall.

Economy

Takamatsu is the largest municipality in Shikoku and is a city with a large concentration of nationwide companies' branch offices, which play a large role in its economy. It also contains most of the national government's branch offices for Shikoku. In 2004, construction of the Symbol Tower, the new symbol of Takamatsu, was completed. The Symbol Tower is in the Sunport area of the city. The Symbol Tower is the tallest building in Takamatsu, and is right next to another tall building The JR Clement Hotel (formerly the ANA Clement Hotel), which is also part of the Sunport complex. Sunport Takamatsu is also connected to the ports of Takamatsu. 

Companies headquartered in the city include:
Shikoku Railway Company 
Tadano Limited
Shikoku Shimbun

Education
Takamatsu has 48 public elementary schools, 22 public middle schools and one public high school operated by the city government. The city has eight public high schools and one combined middle/high school operated by the Kagawa Prefectural Board of Education. There are also two private combined middle/high schools, seven private high schools and one national elementary, one national middle and one national high school.The Kagawa Prefectural government also operates three special education schools for the handicapped.

Universities
Kagawa University
Kagawa Prefectural College of Health Sciences
Takamatsu University

Transportation 
The main train station is Takamatsu Station, operated by JR Shikoku. Trains from here run to destinations around Shikoku, as well as Okayama Station on Honshū via the Seto-Ōhashi Bridge. The private Kotoden railway connects much of Takamatsu, with a hub and department store at Kawaramachi Station, and Takamatsu-Chikko Station nearby Takamatsu Station.  Buses and trains operated by Kotoden accept a contactless payment card for travel called an IruCa.

Airports
Takamatsu Airport

Railways 
 Shikoku Railway Company - Yosan Line
  -  -  -  - 

 Shikoku Railway Company - Kōtoku Line 
  -  -  -  -   -  -  -  - 

 Takamatsu-Kotohira Electric Railroad - Kotoden Kotohira Line
 -  -  -  -  -  -  -  -  -  -  - 
 Takamatsu-Kotohira Electric Railroad - Kotoden Nagao Line
 ( - ) -  -  -  -  -  -  -  -
 Takamatsu-Kotohira Electric Railroad - Kotoden Shido Line
  -  -  -  -  -  -  -  -  -  -  -  -  -  -

Highways 
  Takamatsu Expressway

Ports
Port of Takamatsu

Local attractions
Ritsurin Garden, a Japanese garden designated as a Special Place of Scenic Beauty by the Japanese government
Takamatsu Castle is known for using seawater in its moat and recently the old keep of the castle was successfully restored and opened for public viewing.
Yashima plateau which is home to various sightseeing spots. At the base of the mountain is the open air museum Shikoku Mura where aspects of regional history and culture are exhibited. On the mountain itself is Yashima-ji, number 84 of the Shikoku pilgrimage. At the top of the mountain there is also an observation deck which offers views across the Seto Inland Sea.
Takamatsu also acts as a hub to access various islands of the Seto Inland Sea. These include, Megijima, Ogijima, Naoshima, Teshima and Shōdoshima. Since 2010, Takamatsu, along with these islands and more, has been host to the Setouchi Triennale, a contemporary art festival with many outdoor exhibitions by prominent artists from across the world.

Sports teams
Kagawa Five Arrows (Basketball, B.League)
Kagawa Olive Guyners (Baseball)
Kamatamare Sanuki (Football)
Kagawa Ice Fellows (Ice Hockey)

International relations

Twin towns – Sister cities
Takamatsu is twinned with:
  St. Petersburg, United States
  Tours, France

Friendship cities
Takamatsu has friendship arrangements with:
  Nanchang, China (since 1990)

In literature

Takamatsu is the main setting for Haruki Murakami's novel Kafka on the Shore.
The naval commander Tameichi Hara, born in Takamatsu in 1900, recounts his childhood there in the memoir Japanese Destroyer Captain.
Takamatsu is the main setting for the manga and anime Poco's Udon World.

Notable people from Takamatsu
The following politicians, celebrities, and other well-known people are from Takamatsu (listed alphabetically by surname):

Ema Fujisawa (actor, born 1982)
Shinichiro Furumoto (politician, born 1956)
Yoshihiro Hamaguchi (Olympic athlete, 1926-2011)
Takuya Hirai (politician, born 1958)
Ikuko Kawai (musician and composer, born 1968)
Kan Kikuchi (writer and publisher, 1888-1948)
Akiko Kinouchi (actor, born 1981)
Makoto Kitano (soccer player, born 1967)
Kenji Kobayashi (shogi player, born 1957)
Akihito Kondo (baseball player, 1938-2019)
Yasuhiro Konishi (karateka, 1893-1983)
Bukichi Miki (politician, 1884-1956)
Ryuki Miki (tennis player, 1904-1967)
Lu Wanyao (golfer, born 1996)
Yoshiro Maeda (mixed martial artist, born 1981)
Shigeru Makino (baseball player, 1928-1984)
Ryuya Matsumoto (baseball player, born 1994)
Kojin Nakakita (sledge hockey coach, born 1963)
Futoshi Nakanishi (baseball player, born 1933)
Kiyotaka Nanbara (comedian and TV personality, born 1965)
Ayano Ninomiya (violinist, born 1971)
Tetsuya Noguchi (artist, born 1980)
Junya Ogawa (politician, born 1971)
Kentaro Sonoura (politician, born 1972)
Mikuru Suzuki (darts player, born 1982)
Daisuke Tsuda (singer and drummer, born 1977)
Ayako Uehara (pianist, born 1980)
Emiko Uematsu (politician, born 1967)
Satoru Uyama (fencer, born 1991)

See also

 Busshozan
 Yashima, Kagawa

References

External links
Takamatsu City official website 
Experience Takamatsu-Sense of Wonder- － Official account of Takamatsu city about tourism.

 
Cities in Kagawa Prefecture
Port settlements in Japan
Populated coastal places in Japan